Ted Kazanoff (August 30, 1922 – October 21, 2012) was an American actor best known for playing Judge Scarletti on the original Law & Order series. He played Mr. Nagle in the TV series Brooklyn Bridge and also appeared in two episodes of American Playhouse. He was a member of a long line of actors and teachers of acting who traced their aesthetic lineage back to Konstantin Stanislavsky (1863-1938), the Russian actor and teacher of acting. Kazanoff was also an avid student of directing, and the influence of Vselevod Meyerhold (1874-1940) was especially apparent in his own directing work.

External links
 

1922 births
2012 deaths
American male television actors
Place of birth missing
Place of death missing
20th-century American male actors
21st-century American male actors